John Mitchell, Sr. (December 25, 1937 – January 28, 2020) was an American Negro league outfielder for the Detroit Stars and Birmingham Black Barons from 1955 to 1960.

A native of Autauga County, Alabama, Mitchell was selected to play in the East–West All-Star Game in 1958 and 1960. He died in Birmingham, Alabama in 2020 at age 82.

References

External links
 John Mitchell at Negro Leagues Baseball Museum

1937 births
2020 deaths
Birmingham Black Barons players
Detroit Stars players
20th-century African-American sportspeople
Baseball outfielders
21st-century African-American people